GL events is a French entertainment and medium enterprise founded in 1978, under the name of Polygones Services, by Olivier Ginon and three of his friends, Olivier Roux, Gilles Gouédard-Comte and Jacques Danger. It has been listed on the Paris Stock Exchange since 1998.

Activities 

 Engineering and event logistics.
 Management of event spaces.
 Organization of trade fairs, congresses and events.

GL events is the main shareholder of Lyon OU.

References

External links

 The official GL events website

Entertainment companies of France
Electronic music event management companies
Festival organizations in Europe